Acer Inc. is a Taiwanese multinational hardware and electronics corporation specializing in advanced electronics technology, headquartered in Xizhi, New Taipei City. Its products include desktop PCs, laptop PCs (clamshells, 2-in-1s, convertibles and Chromebooks), tablets, servers, storage devices, virtual reality devices, displays, smartphones and peripherals, as well as gaming PCs and accessories under its Predator brand. Acer is the world's 5th-largest PC vendor by unit sales as of September 2022.

In the early 2000s, Acer implemented a new business model, shifting from a manufacturer to a designer, marketer, and distributor of products, while performing production processes via contract manufacturers. Currently, in addition to its core IT products business, Acer also has a new business entity that focuses on the integration of cloud services and platforms, and the development of smartphones and wearable devices with value-added IoT applications.

History

Acer was founded in 1976 by Stan Shih, his wife Carolyn Yeh, and five others as Multitech in Hsinchu City, Taiwan. The company began with eleven employees and US$25,000 in capital. Initially, it was primarily a distributor of electronic parts and a consultant in the use of microprocessor technologies. It produced the Micro-Professor MPF-I training kit, then two Apple II clones–the Microprofessor II and III–before joining the emerging IBM PC compatible market and becoming a significant PC manufacturer. The company was renamed Acer in 1987.

In 1998, Acer reorganized into five groups: Acer International Service Group, Acer Sertek Service Group, Acer Semiconductor Group, Acer Information Products Group, and Acer Peripherals Group. To dispel complaints from clients that Acer competed with its own products and to alleviate the competitive nature of the branded sales versus contract manufacturing businesses, the company spun off the contract business in 2000, renaming it Wistron Corporation. The restructuring resulted in two primary units: brand name sales and contract manufacturing. In 2001, the company sold its manufacturing units BenQ and Wistron in order to focus resources on design and sales.

Acer increased worldwide sales while simultaneously reducing its labor force by identifying and using marketing strategies that best utilized their existing distribution channels. In January 2005  became the president. By 2005, Acer employed a scant 7,800 people worldwide. Revenues rose from US$4.9 billion in 2003 to US$11.31 billion in 2006.

Acer's North American market share has slipped in the early 2000s, while its European market share has risen.

In the mid-2000s, consumer notebooks were almost the sole growth drivers for the PC industry, and Acer's exceptionally low overheads and dedication to the channel made it one of the main beneficiaries of this trend. Acer grew quickly in Europe in part by embracing the use of more traditional distribution channels targeting retail consumers when some rivals were pursuing online sales and business customers. In 2007, Acer bought Gateway in the United States and Packard Bell in Europe, and became the third-largest provider of computers and the second largest for notebooks, achieving significant improvement in profitability. Acer has strived to become the world's largest PC vendor in the belief that the goal can help it achieve economy of scale and garner higher margin. However, such a reliance on the high-volume, low-value PC market made Acer exposed when buying habits changed.

In September 2018, Acer spun-off its smart gadget unit GadgeTek Inc., which produces Leap Beads, smart prayer beads that track mantras and footsteps.

In 2019, Acer announced the esports social platform PLANET9.gg, which aims to provide game analytics, community-organized competitions, and social experiences.

2013 re-organisation
In November 2013, chairman and CEO J.T. Wang and president Jim Wong both resigned due to the company's poor financial performance. Wang had been reportedly due to leave Acer at the end of the year and was supposed to have been succeeded by Wong. Acer co-founder Stan Shih took over as board chairman and interim president after the departure of Wang and Wong and began to search for new candidates to assume the roles of CEO and president. On 23 December, Acer named Jason Chen, then the vice president of worldwide sales and marketing at Taiwan Semiconductor Manufacturing, as its new president and CEO, effective 1 January.

Acquisitions and joint ventures
 In 1988, Acer acquired Counterpoint Computers.
 In 1990, Acer acquired Altos Computer Corporation.
 In 1993, Acer acquired the PC division of Commodore International.
 In 1997, Acer acquired Texas Instruments notebook computer business.
 On 27 August 2007, Acer announced plans to acquire its US-based rival Gateway, Inc. for US$710 million. Acer's former chairman, J.T. Wang, stated that the acquisition completed Acer's "global footprint, by strengthening [its] United States presence". Included in this acquisition was the eMachines brand.
 In January 2008, Acer announced that it had acquired a controlling interest of 75% of Packard Bell.
 In March 2008, Acer acquired Taiwanese electronics manufacturing company E-TEN.
 In 2009, Acer acquired 29.9% of Italian computer system manufacturer Olidata.
 In August 2010, Acer and Founder Technology signed a memorandum of mutual understanding to strengthen their long-term PC business cooperation.
 In July 2011, Acer bought iGware Inc. (formally BroadOn) for US$320 million. The aim is to create Acer Cloud to enter cloud computing market. iGware had developed cloud software and infrastructure tools for devices. It had also notably partnered with Nintendo on several projects.
 In September 2015, Acer acquired GPS cycling computer brand Xplova.
 In September 2015, Acer invested in robotics start-up company Jibo.
 In March 2016, Acer made an equity investment in grandPad, a provider of technology solutions specifically designed for senior citizens.
 In June 2016, Acer's board of directors approved the establishment of a joint venture with Starbreeze AB to design, manufacture, promote, market and sell StarVR Virtual Reality Head-Mounted Displays.
 In 2016, Acer acquired wireless pet camera maker Pawbo.
 In 2017, Acer became the largest corporate shareholder of AOPEN Inc.
 In October 2017, Acer purchased a 66.7% majority stake in StarVR from Starbreeze.
 In 2019, Acer and Ubisoft teamed up for the Rainbow Six Pro League and other major esports events with the Predator brand as the PC and monitor sponsor.

Operations
As of September 2022, Acer has over 7,713 employees worldwide, operating in 40 countries/territories.

Australia
Acer Computer Australia (ACA) was established in 1990, and is currently Australia's third-largest personal computer vendor, behind Hewlett-Packard Australia and Dell Australia and New Zealand. ACA has Australia's highest overall market share in notebook PC and tablet PC sales. The company is also Australia's leading PC vendor in the government and education markets. As of 2006, it has over 480 employees.

The company repairs, assembles and manufacturers laptops and desktops in Sydney.

Europe
Acer's EMEA headquarters are located in Lugano, Switzerland. From the late 1990s to mid-2000s, Acer had computer factories in Europe. The business area was the whole EMEA. In the Netherlands under the name of Acer IMS bv, there were two factories: Acer laptop factory in Den Bosch and Acer and IBM desktop factory in Tilburg. Acer also had facilities in Germany under the name of IMS in Ahrensburg and Hamburg. Acer computers are also assembled in Mingachevir, Azerbaijan.

India
Acer's subsidiary in India is Acer India (Pvt) Limited, and was incorporated as a wholly-owned subsidiary of Acer Computer International, Ltd. in 1999. It is a notable vendor in key segments such as education, desktop computers, and low profile notebooks for education. The head office is in Bengaluru, India.

Indonesia
PT Acer Indonesia is a wholly-owned subsidiary of Acer and distributes its products through their main distributor PT Dragon Computer & Communication. Acer is currently the second-largest computer vendor in Indonesia. In the first quarter of 2016, Acer recorded >81% market share in Windows tablet in Indonesia.

North America

Acer America Corporation, headquartered in San Jose, California, is a member of the Acer Group. Acer's R&D, engineering, manufacturing, and marketing operations in the United States and Canada are handled by Acer America. The U.S. headquarters was opened with a staff of three in 1985, as Multitech Electronics USA, in Mountain View, California. In 1986, the U.S. headquarters were moved to San Jose, California.

Notable product lines

 Acer Extensa series - Business-oriented laptops
 Acer Iconia - A series of tablet computers
 Acer Aspire - Budget to entry level Personal-use computer and laptops aimed for casual household use
 Acer TravelMate - Lightweight business-oriented laptops
Acer Nitro - Acer's entry to mid-end gaming-oriented laptops
 Acer Predator - Acer's mid to high-end gaming laptops and desktops
 Acer Aspire One - Acer's mid to high-end personal-use laptop
 Acer Swift - A series of mid to high-end ultra-portable notebooks
 Acer Spin - A series of budget to mid-end two-in-one laptops
 Acer ConceptD - Desktop and laptops designed for studios and rendering
Acer Veriton - A high-end business-oriented desktop
Acer Enduro - Acer's series of rugged laptops
Acer Endero Urban - Lightweight semi-rugged laptops.

Brands
 Aazar
 eMachines
ProPack
 Gateway
 Packard Bell
Pawbo
 Predator
Xplova
Nitro

Corporate social responsibility 

In 2005, Acer published its first environmental report, for which the company used the Global Reporting Initiative (GRI) guidelines. All of Acer's tier-one suppliers have acquired ISO 14001 certification.

In November 2012, Acer was ranked 4th place out of 15 in Greenpeace's re-launched Guide to Greener Electronics, with a score of 5.1 points out of 10. The Guide ranks electronics makers according to their policies and practices to reduce their impact on the climate, produce greener products, and make their operations more sustainable.

Greenpeace criticized the company for not setting out targets to reduce greenhouse gas (GHG) emissions as intended in 2010 and for not providing external verification for the GHG emissions it reports for its operations and business travel. It also scored badly on the products criteria receiving no points on product lifecycle while Greenpeace noted that a higher percentage of its products need to meet or exceed Energy Star standards in order for it to score more points.

It received some praise for launching new products which are free from Polyvinyl chloride plastic (PVC) and brominated flame retardants (BFRs) and the company informed Greenpeace that the majority of its products will be PVC/BFR free in the near future. Acer also scored well on chemical management for lobbying for restrictions on organo-halogens and was commended for reporting on GHG emissions from its first-tier suppliers and investigating its second tier.

In its 2012 report on progress relating to conflict minerals, the Enough Project rated Acer the seventh highest of 24 consumer electronics companies.

Acer has been listed on the DJSI's Emerging Markets Index since 2014 and on MSCI's Global Sustainability Indexes in 2015-2016.

Sponsorships
 Acer sponsored the BAR-Honda Formula One racing team in the year . In , Acer provided sponsorship to the Prost Grand Prix Formula One team, and the team's Ferrari engines were badged as Acers.
 Acer sponsored the Ferrari Formula 1 team from 2003 up to 2012 (Official Supplier since 2006) and its Top Sponsor of FC Internazionale – Milano (Inter Milan) Football Club. From 2007 to 2009 Acer has been Official Supplier of FC Barcelona. On 19 March 2007, Acer announced it would sponsor the Factory Fiat Yamaha Team for the 2007 MotoGP World Championship season. Since 2009, Packard Bell (part of Acer Group) has been the sponsor of the Yamaha Factory Racing Team.
 Acer was the worldwide TOP Partners for both the Vancouver 2010 Olympic Winter Games and Singapore Youth Olympic Games. Acer was TOP Partner of the London 2012 Summer Olympics.
On 18 June 2019, Acer Predator sponsored Ubisoft Tom Clancy's Rainbow Six Siege Pro League Season X, becoming the official PC Monitor of Rainbow Six Pro League and Majors.

Controversies
During the 2022 Russian invasion of Ukraine, Acer refused to join the international community and withdraw from the Russian market. Research from Yale University from March 28, 2022, identifying how companies were reacting to Russia's aggression identified Acer in the worst category "Digging in" meaning Defying Demands for Exit: companies defying demands for exit/reduction of activities. Acer subsequently reversed its decision and suspended business in Russia.

See also

 Acer Value Line
 Asus, a rival Taiwan-based company started in 1989 by former Acer engineers
 E-TEN
 eMachines
 Packard Bell
 Gateway, Inc.
 BenQ, formerly Acer CM
 ACC (computer company)
 AOpen, formerly AcerOpen
 List of companies of Taiwan
 Microprofessor I, Acer's first product
 List of computer system manufacturers
 ALi, formerly Acer Laboratories Incorporated
 Wistron, formerly the manufacturing arm of Acer Inc.
PLANET9.gg

References

Acer unveils the SigridWave and announces new updates for Planet9, REVIEWCENTRAL, October 2020. Retrieved 17th of November, 2020.

External links

  (consumer)
  (corporate)

 
1976 establishments in Taiwan
1996 initial public offerings
Companies based in New Taipei
Computer companies established in 1976
Companies listed on the Taiwan Stock Exchange
Consumer electronics brands
Display technology companies
Electronics companies of Taiwan
Formula One engine manufacturers
Mobile phone manufacturers
Multinational companies headquartered in Taiwan
Netbook manufacturers
Portable audio player manufacturers
Taiwanese brands